Melrose Place is an American prime time television soap opera that aired on Fox from July 8, 1992, to May 24, 1999, for seven seasons. The show follows the lives of a group of young adults living in an apartment complex on Melrose Place, in West Hollywood, California. The show was created by Darren Star for Fox and executive produced by Aaron Spelling for his company, Spelling Television. It was the second series in the Beverly Hills, 90210 franchise. Season one and season two were broadcast on Wednesday at 9 pm, after Beverly Hills, 90210. In 1994, for its third-season and for the rest of its run, the show moved to Monday at 8 p.m.

The show had many cast changes during the run. Thomas Calabro and Heather Locklear were the only cast members to remain on the series for all seven seasons, with Calabro being the only cast member to remain on the series throughout its entire run from the pilot episode to the series finale.

The show earned several Golden Globe nominations and placed No. 51 on Entertainment Weekly "New TV Classics" list.

Premise
The show is set in a small fictional apartment courtyard complex located at 4616 Melrose Place in West Hollywood, California.

Cast and characters
Melrose Place premiere season featured eight main characters: Dr. Michael Mancini (Thomas Calabro), a physician who works at Wilshire Memorial Hospital and changes from a kind, devoted husband in season 1 to a mean, adulterous villain from season 2 on; Jane Mancini (Josie Bissett), his budding fashion designer wife; Billy Campbell (Andrew Shue), a struggling writer adapting to life out of his parents' control; Alison Parker (Courtney Thorne-Smith), a receptionist at D&D Advertising; Jake Hanson (Grant Show), a struggling manual laborer and motorcycle enthusiast; Matt Fielding (Doug Savant), a gay social worker; Rhonda Blair (Vanessa A. Williams), an aerobics instructor; and Sandy Harling (Amy Locane), a Southern belle and struggling actress who moonlights as a waitress at a local bar called Shooters, the group's main hangout. Locane was written off after 13 episodes and replaced by Daphne Zuniga as Jo Reynolds, a photographer running away from her abusive husband. Williams was not brought back for the second season, her character having become engaged to a wealthy restaurant entrepreneur.

Actress Heather Locklear, who in season one had guest starred as Alison's ambitious and merciless boss Amanda Woodward, was promoted to series regular status in the second season after her character bought and moved into the Melrose Place apartment building. Although she was always billed as a "special guest star", Locklear remained with the show for the rest of its run. Guest Laura Leighton, recurring as Jane's trouble-making younger sister Sydney Andrews in the first two seasons, was upgraded to series regular for season three. Marcia Cross, recurring as Dr. Kimberly Shaw in season 1, became a series regular by the end of the second season (though she was not credited in the opening until the start of season four). Janet Carroll appeared in several episodes as Marion Shaw, Kimberly's domineering mother. Beata Pozniak was featured in the second season in 7 episodes as Dr. Katya Petrova Fielding, a doctor with a daughter from a previous marriage who befriends and ultimately marries Matt (for a green card), who becomes an endearing father figure for her child.

Season four saw two new regular characters: Peter Burns (Jack Wagner), the ruthless hospital Chief of Staff introduced in season three; and Brooke Armstrong (Kristin Davis), a young, conniving intern at D&D Advertising also recurring the previous season. Davis's character was subsequently killed off in the middle of the fourth season, while Zuniga left the series at the end of the season. Patrick Muldoon also arrived in the third season as the villainous Richard Hart. Although Muldoon was not billed with the main cast (though he appeared in numerous promotional photos with them), he appeared in most of the fourth season's episodes and is also Melrose Places longest recurring character (i.e. not in the opening credits) in terms of number of episodes.

The fifth season saw the addition of Rob Estes as restaurateur Kyle McBride, Lisa Rinna as his opportunistic wife Taylor, and Brooke Langton as Samantha Reilly, an artist and a new tenant in the apartment complex. Bissett and Cross left the series towards the end of the fifth season; Kelly Rutherford was brought in as Megan Lewis, a prostitute hired by Kimberly Shaw to have an affair with Michael Mancini, and David Charvet played Craig Field, Amanda's new co-worker and later Sydney's boyfriend. The season finale featured the exits of series regulars Thorne-Smith, Show, and Leighton.

The season premiere of season six featured the departure of original cast member Doug Savant while Alyssa Milano (recurring as Michael's sister Jennifer Mancini since season five) was bumped to series regular, with Linden Ashby joining the cast as Dr. Brett Cooper and Jamie Luner as his seductive and rich ex-wife, Lexi Sterling.

Charvet was written out in the middle of season 6, and the beginning of season seven saw the departure of Shue, Langton, Rinna, Milano, and Ashby. The show's seventh season introduced John Haymes Newton as Ryan McBride, Kyle's younger brother, and Rena Sofer as Eve Cleary, a woman from Amanda's past who marries Peter. Sofer was not billed with the main cast. Bissett reprised her role as Jane for the seventh season.

Cast

Cast timeline

Cast notes

Main cast members
 Josie Bissett as Jane Andrews Mancini (seasons 1–5, 7), fashion designer, originally from Chicago, married to Michael Mancini, later involved with Sam Towler, Robert Wilson, Chris Marchette, Richard Hart, Jake Hanson and Kyle McBride
 Thomas Calabro as Dr. Michael Mancini, cardiology surgeon at Wilshire Memorial Hospital, originally from New Jersey, married to Jane, and later marries Sydney Andrews, Kimberly Shaw and Megan Lewis, also involved with Amanda Woodward, Brandi Carson, Taylor McBride and Lexi Sterling
 Amy Locane as Sandy Harling (season 1), aspiring actress and waitress at the bar Shooters, originally from South Carolina, involved with Jake
 Doug Savant as Matt Fielding (seasons 1–6), openly gay social worker and physician at Wilshire Memorial, marries Katya Petrova, involved with Jeffrey Lindley, Dr. Paul Graham, Alan Ross and Dan Hathaway
 Grant Show as Jake Hanson (seasons 1–5), mechanic and carpenter, owner of Jake's Bikes and Shooters, involved with Colleen Patterson, Perry Morgan, Kelly Taylor, Sandy Harling, Jo Reynolds, Amanda, Sydney, Shelley Hanson and Jane, later marries Alison Parker
 Andrew Shue as Billy Campbell (seasons 1–7), taxi driver, later copywriter for D&D Advertising, engaged to Alison Parker and later marries Brooke Armstrong and Samantha Reilly, also involved with Amanda, Susan Madsen and Jennifer Mancini
 Courtney Thorne-Smith as Alison Parker Armstrong Hanson (seasons 1–5), advertising executive at D&D Advertising and later waitress at Shooters, originally from Wisconsin, involved with Keith Gray, Steve McMillan, Zack Phillips and Terry Parsons, engaged to Billy and later marries Hayley Armstrong and Jake Hanson
 Vanessa Williams as Rhonda Blair (season 1), aerobics instructor, engaged to Terrence Haggard
 Daphne Zuniga as Jo Reynolds (seasons 1–4), photographer, originally from New York City, previously married to Charles Reynolds, involved with Jake Hanson, Steve McMillan, Reed Carter, Jess Hansen, Richard Hart and Dr. Dominick O'Malley
 Heather Locklear as Amanda Woodward Parezi Burns McBride Blake (seasons 2–7, recurring season 1), vice-president then president at D&D Advertising and Amanda Woodward Advertising, owner of the Melrose Place complex, previously married to Jack Parezi and later marries Dr. Peter Burns, Kyle McBride and Rory Blake, also involved with Billy, Jake, Michael, Bobby Parezi and Craig Field
 Laura Leighton as Sydney Andrews Mancini Field (seasons 3–5, recurring season 1–2), Jane's younger sister, waitress at Shooters, then prostitute, stripper and receptionist at Burns & Mancini, marries Michael and Craig, also involved with Jake, Chris Marchette, Bobby Parezi, Kyle McBride and Carter Gallavan
 Marcia Cross as Dr. Kimberly Shaw Mancini (seasons 4–5, recurring season 1–3), resident doctor at Wilshire Memorial, originally from Cleveland, marries Michael, also involved with Peter and Dr. Brett Cooper
 Kristin Davis as Brooke Armstrong Campbell (season 4, recurring season 3), employee at D&D Advertising, marries Billy
 Jack Wagner as Dr. Peter Howell Burns (seasons 4–7, recurring season 3), chief of staff at Wilshire Memorial, originally from Texas, previously married to Beth Davis and later Amanda and Eve Cleary, also involved with Caitlin Mills, Alycia Barnett, Kimberly, Taylor and Lexi
 Rob Estes as Kyle McBride (seasons 5–7), chef and restaurant owner, former marine, originally from Boston, married to Taylor and later Amanda, also involved with Christine Denton, Jennifer, Sydney and Jane
 Brooke Langton as Samantha Reilly Campbell (seasons 5–7, recurring season 4), artist and salesperson at Jane's (later Sydney's), originally from Maryland, marries Billy, also involved with Craig and Jeff Baylor
 Lisa Rinna as Victoria Taylor Davis McBride (seasons 5–7), restaurant co-owner, originally from Boston, married to Kyle, also involved with Peter, Michael and Nick Reardon
 Kelly Rutherford as Megan Lewis Mancini McBride (seasons 5–7), prostitute, later receptionist at Burns, Mancini & Cooper and Amanda Woodward Advertising, marries Michael and Ryan McBride, also involved with Coop
 David Charvet as Craig Field (seasons 5–6), son of the chairman of D&D Advertising, marries Sydney, also involved with Amanda and Jennifer
 Linden Ashby as Dr. Brett "Coop" Cooper (seasons 6–7), surgeon and partner at Burns, Mancini & Cooper, originally from Cleveland, married to Lexi, also involved with Kimberly and Megan
 Alyssa Milano as Jennifer Mancini (seasons 6–7, recurring season 5), Michael's younger sister, originally from New Jersey, bartender at Upstairs, involved with Kyle, Craig and Billy
 Jamie Luner as Lexi Sterling Cooper (seasons 6–7), interior designer, later owner of Sterling Conway Enterprises, married to Coop, also involved with Peter, Ryan and Michael
 John Haymes Newton as Ryan McBride (season 7), Kyle's younger brother, executive at Amanda Woodward Advertising, married to Callie McBride and later Megan, also involved with Lexi

Seasons and episodes

Filming/Production
Filming for the series took place at a studio in Santa Clarita, California. Stages were located 30 miles outside of Los Angeles.
The scenes filmed outside reveal the original facade of the building at 4616 Greenwood Place in Los Angeles serving as the main backdrop for Melrose Place. The D&D Advertising building is the same complex where the offices of Spelling Entertainment are located on Wilshire Boulevard in Los Angeles.

The production filmed episodes back-to-back, according to Rolling Stone in 1994. A dozen directors were employed during each season to direct the thirty episodes. Charles Correll is by far the main director of the series with 47 episodes to his credit over the entire production period, far ahead of the 27 episodes directed by Chip Chalmers.

In 1997, the filming of the sixth season was brought forward by two weeks because of Heather Locklear's pregnancy, which was not included in the story. A body liner was used for around ten shots. The actress also doubled her filming time and her screen time was reduced to finish filming in mid-September 1997.
Lisa Rinna (Taylor) was also pregnant during filming at the end of the sixth season. However, her pregnancy was integrated into the plot. This was also the case for the pregnancy of Josie Bissett (Jane) during the seventh season. Estes and Bissett welcomed their first child, son Mason True, on July 21, 1999.

Set
Deborah Siegel was the main decorator for the series between 1992 and 1998. Previously, she worked on the series The Colbys. In Melrose Place, "each character has their own business and style," she told Soap Opera Weekly magazine in 1995. She also explains that the residence actually only had two apartments that were continually reorganized for filming.

Nielsen ratings

Melrose Place debuted on July 8, 1992, at No. 19 on the Nielsen ratings with a 10.3/19 share and 16 million viewers. In December 1993, Meredith Berkman of Entertainment Weekly called the show "arguably the hottest one-hour drama on television." Though ratings dropped slightly over the first season, the addition of Heather Locklear as Amanda is credited for improving ratings and bringing the show from No. 94 to No. 50 in the second season.

The series finale was watched by 10.38 million viewers.

Reception

Critical reception
Melrose Place received mixed reviews from critics. As of September 2014, season 1 has a critics' rating of 4.7/10 at Metacritic. One of the critics, Time Richard Zoglin, who gave the season a 2.0/10 score, wrote that the soap is "tapping into nothing more than worn plot lines from The Young and the Restless". Conversely, Ken Tucker of Entertainment Weekly, gave the first season a B− rating, writing: "Hey, I make fun of Melrose Place — but I'm hypnotized by it. As warm-weather escapism, it takes all the issues facing this country, from unemployment to sexual harassment, and turns them into crises that can be solved in an hour." During the second season, David Wild of Rolling Stone wrote: "After debuting in 1992 with a troubled first season that at times rivaled that of the 1962 New York Mets, Melrose Place made a few key trades. The show acquired a journeywoman heavy hitter in the lovely form of Locklear and wisely swapped bothersome Issues and Morals for infinitely more palatable Sex and Villains, emerging as a big winner, particularly with that attractive twentysomething demographic." The third season received positive reviews from critics: "After a couple lukewarm yet entertaining seasons, Melrose Place exploded in season three with the over-the-top, addictive storylines. Remember the crazy Kimberly-Michael-Sydney drama? And then Kimberly tried to keep Jo's baby! Really, this is daytime-soap-drama, heated up for primetime." In 1997, Mark Harris, who gave the soap's sixth season a D rating, stated: "Although the ever-game, deserves-better Heather Locklear still spits out even the worst lines with snappish authority, and the diabolical-doctor duo of Jack Wagner and Thomas Calabro at least try to look interested, they can't sustain a show that has lost its best asset — a twisted joy in its own trashiness."

Accolades
The series won the People's Choice Award in 1993 for 'Favorite New TV Dramatic Series'.

Heather Locklear was nominated for four Golden Globe Awards for Best Actress in a Television Series – Drama for her role as Amanda Woodward on Melrose Place, in 1993, 1994, 1995, and 1996. Laura Leighton was nominated in 1995 for Best Performance by an Actress in a Supporting Role in a Series for her role as Sydney Andrews.

In May 1994, at the height of the show's popularity, the female stars, Heather Locklear, Laura Leighton, Courtney Thorne-Smith, Daphne Zuniga and Josie Bissett, were featured on the cover of Rolling Stone.

TV Guide ranked Amanda Woodward at No. 2 in the short list of "The Biggest TV Bitches", only behind Joan Collins' iconic Alexis Carrington Colby, with whom Locklear co-starred on Dynasty. In Entertainment Weekly, Heather Locklear said about playing her: "Not trying to be a bitch. Just trying to be strong and do what you are supposed to do".

In 2012, Entertainment Weekly reunited Melrose favorites Heather Locklear, Marcia Cross, Laura Leighton, Courtney Thorne-Smith, Josie Bissett, Daphne Zuniga, Andrew Shue, Grant Show and Doug Savant, and they appeared on the cover.

Spin-offs

The original series produced a spin-off series, Models Inc., which ran for one season in 1994–95. That series focused on a Los Angeles modeling agency run by Hillary Michaels (played by Linda Gray), the mother of Melroses Amanda Woodward; the show was cancelled after a single season due to low ratings.

A continuation of the series, also called Melrose Place, premiered on September 8, 2009, on The CW Television Network. The new series featured primarily a new cast, although five actors from the original series made appearances: Thomas Calabro, Laura Leighton, Josie Bissett, Daphne Zuniga and Heather Locklear. The revival series suffered from low ratings and negative reviews, and was cancelled in 2010 after one season.

Lawsuit
In 1996, actress Hunter Tylo was cast in Melrose Place and opted to leave daytime soap opera The Bold and the Beautiful to take the role. However, she was fired by Melrose Place producer Aaron Spelling prior to filming any episodes for the series, when she announced she was pregnant. The character she was to play, Taylor McBride, was recast, Lisa Rinna taking the role. Tylo quickly returned to The Bold and the Beautiful. Tylo sued Spelling on grounds of discrimination for being pregnant and won $4.8 million from a Los Angeles jury. Spelling argued that Tylo's pregnancy rendered her unable to play the character, who was supposed to be a sexy seductress. During the trial, Tylo published pictures of herself while pregnant which showed that she retained a slim figure. Prior to trial, during the discovery phase of the litigation, Tylo's lawyers won a partial victory in an interlocutory appeal challenging a lower court's order compelling her to answer a broad range of personal questions. The Court of Appeal established Tylo's right to refuse to answer questions in her deposition about marital problems and psychological treatment, although the Court sustained the portion of the order which compelled her to answer questions about her efforts to become pregnant, her husband's ability or inability to impregnate her, and communications with her agent with respect to her efforts and ability to become pregnant. The case is widely recognized as an important one in establishing the right of privacy in deposition and the right of female actors to continue to work while pregnant.

Unauthorized story 
On October 10, 2015, a television movie called The Unauthorized Melrose Place Story was released. It tells the behind-the-scenes making-of story of the show, finishing with the filming of the season three finale.

Home media
CBS Home Entertainment (distributed by Paramount) have released all seasons of Melrose Place on DVD in Region 1.

The series has also been released on DVD in Region 2 and 4 by Paramount Home Entertainment.

Due to music licensing issues, most of the original music has been replaced on these DVD releases, and some episodes are edited from their original broadcast versions.

GALA Committee
A group of artists and Melrose Place producers formed the GALA Committee, headed by artist Mel Chin, to bring artworks out of galleries and into primetime television. GALA artists designed artworks that were used as props by Melrose Place characters in the fourth and fifth seasons, often with hidden political messages:
When Alison is pregnant, her quilt is decorated with the molecular structure of RU-486.
A bag of Chinese take-out food is emblazoned with two opposing ideograms translated from Chinese as "Human Rights" and "Turmoil"; both terms were used by the Chinese government to justify a restriction on student protesters of June 4, 1989.
Bottles behind the counter at Shooters bar are decorated with ads and documents chronicling the history of alcohol.
As Alison quits D&D Advertising, a framed ad in the background features a bombed-out building.  The damage to the structure is in the shape of a liquor bottle, and the words "Total Proof" appear on the poster.

Chin compared the works to viruses, symbiotic and invisible. The project was called In the Name of the Place, as part of the "Uncommon Sense" art show at the Geffen Contemporary at MOCA, Los Angeles, California in 1997. A portion of the fifth season was filmed at the Geffen Contemporary where the project was displayed. The artwork was also shown at the 1997 Kwangju Biennale in Kwangju, Korea and at Grand Arts in Kansas City, Missouri in 1998. Sotheby's Auction house auctioned almost fifty of these artworks for charity.

Related series

Notes

References

External links

 
 
 

1992 American television series debuts
1999 American television series endings
1990s American drama television series
1990s American LGBT-related drama television series
1990s television soap operas
American television soap operas
American primetime television soap operas
American television spin-offs
Beverly Hills, 90210 (franchise)
English-language television shows
Fox Broadcasting Company original programming
Serial drama television series
Television series by CBS Studios
Television series by Spelling Television
American television series revived after cancellation
Television shows set in Los Angeles
Television shows filmed in Santa Clarita, California
Television series created by Darren Star